The 1951 Monte Carlo Rally was the 21st Rallye Automobile de Monte-Carlo. It was won by Jean Trévoux.

Entry list

Results

References

External links 

Monte Carlo Rally
Monte Carlo Rally
Monte Carlo Rally
Monte Carlo Rally